Thaida is a genus of South American cribellate araneomorph spiders in the family Austrochilidae, first described by Ferdinand Karsch in 1880.  it contains only two species in Chile and Argentina.

References

Araneomorphae genera
Austrochilidae
Spiders of South America
Taxa named by Ferdinand Karsch